Aarif Rahman (born 26 February 1987), also known as Aarif Lee Zhi-ting, is a Hong Kong actor, singer and songwriter.

Early life
Born in Hong Kong, Aarif Rahman is of mixed Arab, Malay and Chinese descent. He grew up in Hong Kong and attended King George V School, where he discovered his penchant for music and started playing drums, guitar and the piano, as well as dabbling in song-writing.

After graduating with a physics degree from the Imperial College London, Rahman signed with East Asia Record Production company.

Career
Rahman first gained the interest of the Hong Kong music scene when he was exposed as the writer who penned all the lyrics in Janice Vidal's 2009 English album Morning. Following this, in 2009 he released his debut album Starting from Today, which won him the Best Newcomer award at the Metro Radio Music Awards.

Rahman then made his film debut in the movie Echoes of the Rainbow (2010), which won him the Hong Kong Film Award for Best New Performer and Hong Kong Film Directors' Guild for Best New Actor of the Year – Silver Award. The theme song which he sang also won the Hong Kong Film Award for Best Original Song. He then starred as Bruce Lee in the dramatic biopic film Bruce Lee, My Brother (2010) and as a police investigator in the crime thriller Cold War (2012).

In 2013, Rahman starred in the Mainland romantic comedy One Night Surprise. The low-budget film unexpectedly became a commercial success, and received positive reviews. Rahman won the Best New Actor award at the 1st China International Film Festival London and Outstanding Performance award at the Chinese Film Media Awards for his performance. Rahman then starred in historical drama  The Empress of China, where he played the role of Li Zhi. The 82-episode TV series was broadcast on Hunan Television from 21 December 2014 to 5 February 2015, and earned increased recognition for Rahman in the Mainland region. He won the Best Actor in the Ancient Drama category at the Huading Awards for his performance.

In 2016, Rahman starred alongside Korean actress Kim Ha-neul in the family film Making Family. He also featured in Guo Jingming's fantasy animated motion capture  L.O.R.D: Legend of Ravaging Dynasties, and reprised his role in the sequel of Cold War.

In 2017, Rahman starred alongside Jackie Chan in the action comedy film Kung Fu Yoga. The same year, he starred in Tsui Hark's science fiction wuxia film The Thousand Faces of Dunjia.

In 2019, Rahman starred in the historical romance drama Princess Silver as the male lead.
He is considered one of the promises in film acting, as he himself recognized in April 2021, during an interview for Vanity Teen China magazine.

Filmography

Film

Television series

Discography

Studio albums

Singles

Awards

Music

Film and television

References

External links
 

1987 births
Living people
Hong Kong male singers
Cantopop singer-songwriters
Cantopop singers
Cantonese people
Mandopop singers
Hong Kong people of Malay descent
Hong Kong people of Arab descent
Hong Kong people of Malaysian descent
Alumni of King George V School, Hong Kong
Alumni of Imperial College London
21st-century Hong Kong male actors
Hong Kong male film actors
Hong Kong male television actors